Prokopiev or Prokopyev (Cyrillic: Прокопиев or Прокопьев) is a Slavic masculine surname, the feminine counterpart is Prokopieva or Prokopyeva. It originates from the masculine given name Prokopy, which means successful in Greek. The surname may refer to
Aleksandar Prokopiev (born 1953), Macedonian writer and musician
Alexander Prokopyev (born 1986), Russian politician
Aleksandra Prokopyeva (born 1994), Russian alpine ski racer
Dragan Prokopiev, Bulgarian choir conductor and music pedagogue
Ivo Prokopiev (born 1971), Bulgarian businessman 
Sergey Prokopyev (disambiguation), multiple people
Trajko Prokopiev (1909–1979), Yugoslavian composer
Svetlana Prokopyeva (born 1979), Russian journalist

References

Bulgarian-language surnames
Macedonian-language surnames
Russian-language surnames